Ebenezer Henry Brew-Riverson Jnr, is a veteran actor who played multi-character roles on Ghanaian television in the 1980s and 1990s. His father has the same name as him (minus the jnr). He is currently a lecturer with the Theater Arts Department of the University of Education, Winneba.

Filmography

References 

Ghanaian actors
Living people
Ghanaian male film actors
Year of birth missing (living people)